Luka is a municipality and village in Česká Lípa District in the Liberec Region of the Czech Republic. It has about 100 inhabitants.

Administrative parts
The village of Týn is an administrative part of Luka.

References

Villages in Česká Lípa District